Ranger Independent School District is a public school district based in Ranger, Texas (USA).  Located in Eastland County, a small portion of the district extends into Stephens County.

Schools
Ranger ISD has three campuses - Ranger High School (grades 9-12), Ranger Middle School (grades 6-8) and Ranger Elementary School (grades PK-5).

Ranger College was part of the district until 1950, when it became a separate community college entity.

Walter Prescott Webb (1888-1963), historian of the American West and author of the classic The Great Plains (1931), graduated from Ranger High School about 1905.

In 2009, the school district was rated "academically acceptable" by the Texas Education Agency.

References

External links
Ranger ISD

School districts in Eastland County, Texas
School districts in Stephens County, Texas